Swiss Tour (or Four Days Leave) is a 1949 American-Swiss drama film directed by Leopold Lindtberg and starring Cornel Wilde, Josette Day and Simone Signoret. It marked the film debut of Liselotte Pulver who went on to be a major star of German cinema during the following decade.

Plot

Cast
 Cornel Wilde as Stanley Robin  
 Josette Day as Suzanne  
 Simone Signoret as Yvonne  
 John Baragrey as Jack 
 Richard Erdman as Eddy  
 Alan Hale Jr. as Joe  
 George O. Petrie as Sidney 
 Leopold Biberti as Walter Hochull
 Liselotte Pulver as a GI flirt 
 Robert Bichler  
 Christiane Martin

References

Bibliography 
 Bock, Hans-Michael & Bergfelder, Tim. The Concise CineGraph. Encyclopedia of German Cinema. Berghahn Books, 2009.

External links 
 

1949 films
1949 drama films
Swiss drama films
American drama films
1940s English-language films
English-language Swiss films
1940s German-language films
Films directed by Leopold Lindtberg
Films with screenplays by Ring Lardner Jr.
Film Classics films
Swiss black-and-white films
Austrian black-and-white films
1940s American films